Mali Cirnik pri Šentjanžu ( or) is a village in the Municipality of Šentrupert in southeastern Slovenia. It lies in the hills east of Šentrupert just off the road towards Šentjanž in the historical region of Lower Carniola. The municipality is now included in the Southeast Slovenia Statistical Region. The settlement includes the hamlets of Stražberk (in older sources also Stražberg), Vrhe, and Selo.

Name
The name of the settlement was changed from Mali Cirnik to Mali Cirnik pri Šentjanžu in 1955. The name Mali Cirnik pri Šentjanžu literally means 'little Cirnik near Šentjanž', distinguishing the village from neighboring Veliki Cirnik (literally, 'big Cirnik'). The name Cirnik is derived from the Slovene common noun cer 'Turkey oak', thus referring to the local vegetation. In the past the German name was Kleinzirnik.

References

External links
Mali Cirnik pri Šentjanžu at Geopedia

Populated places in the Municipality of Šentrupert